Eve is a South Korean television series starring Seo Yea-ji, Park Byung-eun, Yoo Sun, and Lee Sang-yeob. It aired on tvN from June 1 to July 21, 2022, every Wednesday and Thursday at 22:30 (KST) for 16 episodes.

Synopsis
Eve tells the story of a chaebol family  trillion divorce lawsuit that shocks the entire nation, of which, at the center of the lawsuit is Lee La-el (Seo Yea-ji), the daughter of the chaebol family.

Cast

Main

 Seo Yea-ji as Lee La-el/Kim Sun-bin
 Kim Ji-an as young Lee La-el 
 A 28-year-old who is the daughter of a genius scientist. Thirteen years ago, her happy family life was shattered by her father's death. She therefore began to seek and plan revenge for 13 years, starting by targeting Kang Yoon-gyeom, one of the main culprits who orchestrated the death of her father. Unexpectedly, she slowly fell in love with Yoon-gyeom and thus became torn between her desire for revenge and her feelings for Yoon-gyeom.
 Park Byung-eun as Kang Yoon-gyeom
 The 41-year-old heir of LY Group and So-ra's husband. He falls in love with La-el and has an affair with her, without realizing that this is part of La-el's revenge for her family's tragedy that he and his family had masterminded 13 years ago.
 Yoo Sun as Han So-ra
 The 45-year-old wife of Yoon-Hyeon and daughter of South Korea's highest-ranking politician.  She is dangerously obsessive about her husband.
 Lee Sang-yeob as Seo Eun-pyung
 A 38-year-old former human rights lawyer who became the youngest member of the National Assembly. He helped La-el to leave South Korea after her family's tragedy 13 years ago. He is a righteous person willing to give up anything for love.

Supporting

People around Lee La-el
 Lee Il-hwa as Jang Moon-hee
 A woman who pretends to be La-el's mother and was an accomplice in her revenge plot.
 Lee Ha-yool as Jang Jin-wook
 La-el's husband who loves his wife dearly. He had a close working relationship with Yoon-gyeom.
 Kim Si-woo as Jang Bo-ram
 Jin-wook's daughter and La-el's stepdaughter. She was doted and cared by La-el.
 Jo Deok-hyun as Lee Tae-joon
 La-el's father and a genius scientist who was killed 13 years ago due to a sinister plot by the corrupt higher-ups of South Korea.
 Kim Jung-young as Kim Jin-sook
 La-el's mother, who was loving and caring towards her daughter. She went missing after her husband died. She was later revealed to have been killed by So-ra.

People around Kang Yoon-gyeom
 Park Myung-hoon as Kang Si-gyeom
 Yoon-gyeom's elder brother.
 Lee Se-na as Yoon Soo-jung
  as Kang Da-bi
 Yoon-gyeom's second child and daughter. She is a timid but good-natured girl.

People around Han So-ra
 Jeon Kook-hwan as Han Pan-ro 
 So-ra's father and the highest ranking politician of South Korea. He is ruthless and corrupt, and was one of the plotters behind La-el's father's death.
 Jung Hae-kyun as Kim Jeong-chul
 Pan-ro's faithful henchman who killed La-el's father and forced him to transfer his company to LY Group.
 Cha Ji-hyuk as Moon Do-wan
 Son So-mang as Eun Dam-ri
 Kim Ye-eun as Yeo Ji-hee
 Lee Ji-ha as Chae Ri-sa

People around Seo Eun-pyung
 So Hee-jung as Kim Gye-young

Production and release
On November 21, 2021, it was announced that filming had begun, with premiere period scheduled for the first half of 2022. On February 25, 2022, a photo showing the main cast holding the script was released.

Eve was originally scheduled to premiere on May 25, 2022, but it was delayed by a week due to quality enhancement of the series.

Original soundtrack

Part 1

Part 2

Part 3

Part 4

Viewership

Awards and nominations

References

External links
  
 
 

TVN (South Korean TV channel) television dramas
Television series about revenge
South Korean romance television series
South Korean melodrama television series
Korean-language television shows
Television series by Studio Dragon
Television series by C-JeS Entertainment
2022 South Korean television series debuts
2022 South Korean television series endings